The Palazzo Tiepolo Passi is a Venetian Gothic-style palace located between the Palazzo Giustinian Persico and the Palazzo Soranzo Pisani on the Grand Canal, in the Sestieri of San Polo, Venice, Italy. The neighboring building is Palazzo Soranzo Pisani.

History
The narrow asymmetric palace was commissioned in the 14th century. It has undergone modern refurbishment.

References

Tiepolo Passi
Tiepolo Passi
Gothic architecture in Venice